Arno Neumann (7 February 1885 - 7 March 1966) was a German international footballer.

References

1885 births
1966 deaths
Association football forwards
German footballers
Germany international footballers
Dresdner SC players
Footballers from Dresden